Princes of the Night (French: Nuits de princes) is a novel by the writer Joseph Kessel which was originally published in 1927. It is set amongst the community of White Russian exiles in Paris.

Adaptations
The novel has been made into films on three occasions. A 1930 adaptation directed by Marcel L'Herbier and starring Gina Manès. This was remade in 1938 by Vladimir Strizhevsky with Käthe von Nagy in the lead role. A separate German-language version After Midnight was also produced at his time by Carl Hoffmann with Gina Falckenberg appearing.

References

Bibliography
 Goble, Alan. The Complete Index to Literary Sources in Film. Walter de Gruyter, 1999.

1927 French novels
Novels by Joseph Kessel
French novels adapted into films
Novels set in Paris